Pioneer is a rural locality in the local government area (LGA) of Dorset in the North-east LGA region of Tasmania. The 2016 census recorded a population of 89 for the state suburb of Pioneer.

History
Pioneer was gazetted as a locality in 1955. Previous name was “Bradshaw Creek” after William Bradshaw who founded the Pioneer Tin Mine. The name was changed to Pioneer in 1955, but had been in use as early as 1902.
Bradshaw's Creek Post Office opened on 1 July 1883 and was renamed Pioneer in 1955.

Geography
The Ringarooma River flows through from west to north. The Wynford River enters from the south and flows north to meet the Ringarooma River in the centre.

Road infrastructure 
Route B82 (Gladstone Road / Main Road) passes through from west to north. Route C839 (Racecourse Road) starts at an intersection with B82 and runs north-west until it exits. Route C841 (Tebrakunna Road) starts at an intersection with B82 and runs east until it exits.

Notes and references

Towns in Tasmania
North East Tasmania
Localities of Dorset Council (Australia)